Bayerischer Plöckenstein is a mountain of the Bavarian Forest and Bohemian Forest, on the border between Germany and the Czech Republic. It is not far from the Plöckenstein itself.

Mountains and hills of the Czech Republic
Mountains of Bavaria
Bohemian Forest
Mountains of the Bavarian Forest